is a railway station operated by JR Kyushu in Saga City, Saga Prefecture, Japan. It is on the Nagasaki Main Line and is also the starting point and eastern terminus of the Karatsu Line.

Lines

Station layout 
The station, which is unstaffed, consists of a side and an island platform serving three tracks. A small station building, of simple concrete construction, serves as a waiting room and houses an automatic ticket vending machine. Access to the opposite side platform is by means of a footbridge. Two sidings branch off track 1 and are used by track maintenance equipment. There is a stone monument in front of the station which claims that Kubota Station opened on 10 October 1896. A bike shed is located in front of the station.

Environs
In front of the station are various shops. To the north of the station are fields. To the south of the station are many businesses and residences.
National Route 34
National Route 207
Kobota Post Office

Adjacent stations

History
On 14 December 1903, another stretch of track which the Kyushu Railway had acquired in 1902 between Miyoken (today ) and Azamibaru (today ) was extended south and linked up at Kubota. When the Kyushu Railway was nationalized on 1 July 1907, Japanese Government Railways (JGR) took over control of the station. On 12 October 1909, the track to Yamaguchi became the Nagasaki Main Line while the track to Nishi-Karatsu became the Karatsu Line. With the privatization of Japanese National Railways (JNR), the successor of JGR, on 1 April 1987, control of the station passed to JR Kyushu.

Passenger statistics
In fiscal 2016, the station was used by an average of 614 passengers daily (boarding passengers only), and it ranked 219th among the busiest stations of JR Kyushu.

See also
 List of railway stations in Japan

References

External links
Kubota Station (JR Kyushu)

Railway stations in Saga Prefecture
Nagasaki Main Line
Railway stations in Japan opened in 1896